Operation Mascot was an unsuccessful British carrier air raid conducted against the German battleship Tirpitz at her anchorage in Kaafjord, Norway, on 17 July 1944. Few of the British airmen were able to spot the battleship, and their attacks did not  inflict any significant damage. Tirpitz was eventually disabled and then sunk by Royal Air Force heavy bombers later in the year.

Home Fleet forces dispatched

The attack force comprised the following ships and Fleet Air Arm units: 
 Flagship of Admiral Henry R. Moore
 1 King George V-class battleship (10 × 14-inch main btty, 28 kn): 
 First Cruiser Squadron
 
 1841 Naval Air Squadron (18 Vought F4U Corsairs)
 No. 8 Torpedo Bomber Reconnaissance Wing
 827 Naval Air Squadron (12 Fairey Barracudas)
 830 Naval Air Squadron (12 Barracudas)
 
 880 Naval Air Squadron (12 Supermarine Seafires)
 1840 Naval Air Squadron (20 Grumman F6F Hellcats)
 842 Flight (3 Fairey Swordfish)
 
 894 Naval Air Squadron (16 Seafires)
 1770 Naval Air Squadron (12 Fairey Fireflys)
 No. 9 Torpedo Bomber Reconnaissance Wing
 820 Naval Air Squadron (12 Barracudas)
 826 Naval Air Squadron (12 Barracudas)
 2 County-class heavy cruisers (8 × 8-inch main btty, 31.5 kn): , 
 1 Dido-class light cruiser (8 × 5.25-inch main btty, 32.25 kn): 
 1 Fiji-class light cruiser (12 × 6-inch main btty, 31.25 kn): 
 Third Destroyer Flotilla
 4 M-class:  (flagship), 
 1 S-class: 
 1 Tribal-class: 
 20th Escort Group
 3 Captain-class frigates:   (flagship), 
 1 B-class destroyer:

Strike force

The strike force launched in the early hours of 17 July comprised the following units:
No. 8 Torpedo Bomber Reconnaissance Wing (21 Barracudas) 
No. 9 Torpedo Bomber Reconnaissance Wing (23 Barracudas)
1770 Naval Air Squadron (12 Fireflys)
1840 Naval Air Squadron (20 Hellcats)
1841 Naval Air Squadron (18 Corsairs)

Notes

References
Citations

Works consulted

World War II orders of battle